The  is a historical building that is used as a complex that includes a shopping mall, banquet hall, and event venues. It is operated by Yokohama Akarenga Co. Ltd., and located at the Port of Yokohama in Naka-ku, Yokohama, Kanagawa, Japan.

History 

In the late 19th century, the Yokohama city government worked on constructing new harbour facilities, and the first reclamation work was begun in 1899. The work, completed in 1905, was followed by expansion work which ended a year later. Planned by a Japanese architect and a government official, Tsumaki Yorinaka, the current Building No. 2 was constructed in 1911, and the current Building No. 1 was erected in 1913. Both were to be used as customs houses.

When the 1923 Great Kantō earthquake struck Yokohama, the red brick buildings were damaged, but suffered less than other buildings due to their reinforced structure with iron implanted between the bricks. Repair work continued until 1930, and after World War II, the buildings were requisitioned by the American occupation forces between 1945 and 1956. After the buildings were returned to Japan, their use decreased with the advent of containerization, and the buildings ended their role as customs houses in 1989.

The process of renovation of the building was envisioned and pursued by Naoshi Kawabata. In 1992, Yokohama city acquired jurisdiction over the buildings, and restoration work was carried out from 1994 to 1999. This work, in which the roof and structure of the buildings were strengthened, was conducted by Takenaka Corporation, a Japanese architectural company. After the inside of the buildings was renovated, they were opened as the Yokohama Red Brick Warehouse on April 12, 2002.

Overview 

The complex is divided into buildings No. 1 and No. 2. Both buildings are three stories high, and are 22.6 metres wide and 17.8 metres tall. The area of Building No. 1 is 5,575 m², with a length of 76 metres, while Building No. 2 has a total area of 10,755 m², and a length of 149 metres.

Building No. 1 is regarded as a cultural facility, and is utilized as an event venue for art exhibitions, film festivals, musical competitions and plays. Building No. 2 houses a shopping mall and restaurant arcade, and a balcony from which visitors can view the harbour opened on the 3rd floor in 2007. Other sightseeing spots including Yokohama Chinatown, Minato Mirai 21, and Yamashita Park are located nearby.

Sports 

On December 10, 2018, it was announced that the Final Stage of SASUKE 36's special would be broadcast live from the Yokohama Red Brick Warehouse on TBS on New Year's Eve. The 2019 edition of SASUKE's Final Stage will once again be broadcast live from the warehouse on December 31, 2019. It will be the 2nd consecutive SASUKE tournament to have a live Final Stage.

Sources

External links 

 In with the Old: Yokohama's Red Brick Warehouses 
 Red Brick Warehouse Yokohama - AsiaRooms.com 
 Yokohama Red Brick Warehouses, the building No.1 
 The Yokohama Red Brick Warehouse Official Homepage 

Buildings and structures in Yokohama
Naka-ku, Yokohama
Tourist attractions in Yokohama
UNESCO Asia-Pacific Heritage Awards winners